This is a list of past and present members of the Senate of Canada representing the province of New Brunswick.

During the Quebec Conference of 1864, New Brunswick was guaranteed 10 Senate seats, but because Prince Edward Island stalled for equal representation in the upper house, New Brunswick was awarded two of Prince Edward Island's Senate seats until 1873 when Prince Edward Island gave in and joined confederation New Brunswick dropped to 10 seats. New Brunswick kept 12 seats until the first two senators ended their term after 1873, they were not replaced.

Current senators

Notes:

1 Senators are appointed to represent New Brunswick. Each senator may choose to designate a geographic area within the province as his or her division.
2 Senators are appointed by the Governor-General of Canada on the recommendation of the prime minister.

Historical

Notes:

1 Senators are appointed to represent New Brunswick. Each senator may choose to designate a geographic area within New Brunswick as his or her division.
2 Senators are appointed by the Governor-General of Canada on the recommendation of the prime minister.

Maritimes regional senators
Senators listed were appointed to represent the Maritimes under section 26 of the Constitution Act. This clause has only been used once before to appoint two extra senators to represent four regional Senate divisions: Ontario, Quebec, the Maritimes and the Western Provinces.

As vacancies open up among the normal members of the Senate, they are automatically filled by the regional senators. Regional senators may also designate themselves to a senate division in any province of their choosing in their region.

Notes:

1 Party listed was the last party of which the senator was a member.
2 Senators are appointed to represent their region. Each senator may choose to designate a geographic area within their region as his or her division.
3 Senators are appointed by the Governor-General of Canada on the recommendation of the prime minister.

Declined Senate appointments
Only three people have ever declined a Senate appointment, two from New Brunswick and one from Quebec.

See also
Lists of Canadian senators

References

External links
Current Senators List Parliament Website
A Legislative and Historical Overview of the Senate

New Brunswick
Senators